The Miles M.16 Mentor was a 1930s British single-engined three-seat monoplane training and communications aircraft built by Miles Aircraft Limited.

Design and development
The origins of the Mentor can be traced back to the Air Ministry's release of Specification 38/37, which called for a three-seat cabin monoplane for use in multiple capacities, including for instrument training, radio training, and communications work during both day and night time. Amongst the requirements requested in the specification included the use of a de Havilland Gipsy Six engine, the provision of dual flying controls, instrumentation suitable for blind-flying, doors on either side of the cockpit. Upon receipt of the specification, Miles opted to produce its own response, which it largely derived from its existing Miles M.7 Nighthawk.

This aircraft, which was given the name Mentor, comprised wooden construction wherever practical. It was fitted with a single-piece windscreen made of moulded Perspex, which the company had only recently pioneered on the Miles Whitney Straight. According to aviation author Don Brown, the Mentor's design process was relatively straightforward, involving only 630 man weeks within Miles' drawing office.

To validate the design, a single prototype was produced. On 5 January 1938, this prototype (Serial L4392) conducted the type's maiden flight, piloted by H Skinner. In comparison to the preceding Nighthawk, the Mentor prototype was determined to possess inferior performance attributes, such as being somewhat slow to respond to the controls. Despite this somewhat unfavourable comparison, the overall conclusion drawn from its official trials was that the aircraft was satisfactory for its purpose; thus Miles received an order for 45 aircraft on behalf of the Royal Air Force (RAF).

Operational history 
Between April 1938 and February 1939, the entire production run of the Mentor were delivered to the RAF. The type were principally flown by No. 24 Squadron, while numerous RAF station flights also few several Mentors as well.

Only a single Mentor is believed to have survived the Second World War; this aircraft (Serial L4420) was declared to be surplus to requirements and thus sold into the civil sector as G-AHKM during May 1946. On 1 April 1950, this final Mentor was destroyed by a crash at Clayhidon, Devon, thus ending all operations of the type.

Operators

Royal Air Force
No. 24 Squadron RAF

Specifications (Mentor)

See also

References

Citations

Bibliography

 
 Amos, Peter. and Brown, Don Lambert. Miles Aircraft Since 1925, Volume 1. London: Putnam Aeronautical, 2000. .
 Brown, Don Lambert. Miles Aircraft Since 1925. London: Putnam & Company Ltd., 1970. .
 Halley, J.J. Royal Air Force Aircraft L1000-N9999. Air-Britain (Historians) Ltd. 1993. .
 The Illustrated Encyclopedia of Aircraft (Part Work 1982–1985). Orbis Publishing.
 Jackson, A.J. British Civil Aircraft since 1919. London: Putnam, 1974. .
 Swanborough, Gordon. British Aircraft at War, 1939–1945. East Sussex, UK: HPC Publishing, 1997. .

External links

 Miles M.16 Mentor

1930s British military utility aircraft
Mentor
Single-engined tractor aircraft
Aircraft first flown in 1938